Eugène Lourié (8 April 1903 – 26 May 1991) was a French film director, art director, production designer, set designer and screenwriter who was known for his collaborations with Jean Renoir and for his 1950s science fiction movies. Allmovie contributor Sandra Brennan has written that he was "among the best art directors in French cinema." He was nominated for an Academy Award in 1969 for Best Visual Effects on the film Krakatoa, East of Java.

Early life
Lourié was born in Kharkov, Russian Empire in 1903.
His first experience with cinema was in 1911 when a movie theater opened in Kharkov. In 1919, he worked on an anti-communist film titled Black Crowes. After he fled from the Soviet Union, he made his way to Istanbul. While there he made money for a fare to Paris, France by painting and drawing movie posters. He even slept in the theater on top of a piano to save money.

Film career
In the 1930s, he worked as a production designer for such directors as Jean Renoir, Max Ophüls, and René Clair. As an assistant and production designer to Renoir, he worked on such French films as La Grande illusion and La Règle du Jeu. After Renoir had moved to Hollywood in the early 1940s, Lourié moved as well, and worked with other directors including Sam Fuller, Charlie Chaplin, and Robert Siodmak. Then in 1953, he made his directorial debut with The Beast from 20,000 Fathoms, the first of three dinosaur films that Lourié would direct. The film was profitable, however Lourié has said that he regrets that the film typecast him as a science fiction director. He decided that after his 1961 film, Gorgo, he would stop directing movies because he did not want to direct "the same comic-strip monsters." Eight years later, he received an Academy Award nomination for his visual effects on Krakatoa, East of Java.

In 1980, Lourié designed Clint Eastwood's Bronco Billy. Lourié also had an acting part in Richard Gere's 1983 picture, Breathless.

Lourié makes a silent cameo appearance in Krakatoa, East of Java, portraying a lighthouse keeper on the coast of Java in 1883 who observes Krakatoa's final, cataclysmic explosion and enters the lighthouse to send news of it by telegraph.

Death
Lourié died on 26 May 1991 due to a stroke while in the Motion Picture and Television Hospital in Woodland Hills.

Partial filmography
 Jeanne (1934)
 The Bread Peddler (1934)
 Dark Eyes (1935)
 The Alibi (1937)
 The Messenger (1937)
 Ramuntcho (1938)
 The Lafarge Case (1938)
 There's No Tomorrow (1939)
 Cristobal's Gold (1940)
 The Beast from 20,000 Fathoms (1953), director
 The Colossus of New York (1958), director
 The Giant Behemoth (1959), director
 Gorgo (1961), director
 Flight from Ashiya (1964)
 Crack in the World (1965) 
 Bikini Paradise (1967)
 Krakatoa, East of Java (1969)
 Kung Fu (1972-1975)

See also
 Art Directors Guild Hall of Fame

References

External links

Model Ships in the Cinema: Krakatoa, East of Java, 1969, including photo gallery of special effects, still photo of Lourié's appearance in the film, and quotes from Lourié, Eugene, My Work in Films, Harcourt Brace Jovanovich, 1985 .

1903 births
1991 deaths
French art directors
French film directors
French male screenwriters
20th-century French screenwriters
Science fiction film directors
Death in California
French people of Russian descent
French production designers
20th-century French male writers
White Russian emigrants to France